Poliopsis is a monotypic genus of nemerteans belonging to the monotypic family  Poliopsiidae. The only species is Poliopsis lacazei.

The species is found in France.

References

Heteronemertea
Nemertea genera
Monotypic nemertea genera